Clivina wiluna is a species of ground beetle in the subfamily Scaritinae. It was described by Darlington in 1953. It is mostly found in Australia

References

wiluna
Beetles described in 1953